The Golden Rule describes a "reciprocal" or "two-way" relationship between one's self and others that involves both sides equally and in a mutual fashion.

Golden Rule may also refer to:

Economics
 Golden Rule (fiscal policy), a rule adopted in the UK by HM Treasury to provide guidelines for fiscal policy
 Golden Rule savings rate, the savings rate which maximizes consumption in the Solow growth model

Science
 Fermi's golden rule, a formula of quantum mechanics
 Ronen's golden rule for cluster radioactivity, in nuclear physics

Business
 Golden Rule Airlines, an airline in Kyrgyzstan that ceased operations in 2011
 Golden Rule Insurance Company, an American health insurance company that was acquired by UnitedHealth Group in 2003
 Golden Rule Store, the original name of J. C. Penney, an American department store chain

Entertainment
 Golden Rule (album), the seventh studio album by Australian rock band Powderfinger
 Golden Rule (EP), an EP by Golden State
 "That Golden Rule," a song by Biffy Clyro
 "3-Way (The Golden Rule)," a song by The Lonely Island
 "Golden Rule," a space habitat in The Cat Who Walks Through Walls a science fiction novel by Robert A. Heinlein
 The Golden Rule, a 1961 magazine cover painting by Norman Rockwell

Miscellaneous
 Golden rule (law), or the British Rule, a form of statutory construction traditionally applied by English courts
 Golden Rule (ship), a boat skippered by Albert Bigelow used in a nuclear-weapons protest
 Samuel M. Jones (1846–1904), a.k.a. "Golden Rule" Jones, mayor of Toledo, Ohio
 Rule of three (mathematics), also known as Golden Rule, a particular form of cross-multiplication in elementary mathematics
 Goldwater rule, an Ethics related rule on commenting individuals' mental status without examining them personally or exposing them publicly without consent.

See also

Great Commandment
Golden ratio
Rule of thirds